Eumathes is a genus of longhorn beetles of the subfamily Lamiinae.

 Eumathes amazonicus Bates, 1866
 Eumathes canus (Germar, 1824)
 Eumathes colombicus (Thomson, 1868)
 Eumathes cuprascens Bates, 1874

References

Calliini
Cerambycidae genera